Ylli is an Albanian masculine given name, which means "star". Yllka and Yllita are the female versions. 

Ylli may refer to:
Ylli Asllani (born 1959), politician
Ylli Bufi (born 1948), politician 
Ylli Lama (born 1954), politician
Yllka Mujo (born 1953), actress
Ylli Pango (born 1952), psychologist and politician
Ylli Sallahi (born 1994), football player
Ylli Shameti (born 1984), football player
Ylli Shehu (born 1966), football player

References

Albanian masculine given names